James Alfred Powell (5 May 1899 – 8 March 1973) was an English first-class cricketer active 1926–44 who played for Middlesex and Marylebone Cricket Club (MCC). He was born in Bloomsbury; died in Kensington.

References

1899 births
1973 deaths
English cricketers
Middlesex cricketers
Marylebone Cricket Club cricketers